Wolf 424 is a binary star system comprising two red dwarf stars at a distance of approximately 14.2 light years from the Sun.  It is located in the constellation Virgo, between the stars ε Virginis and ο Virginis.

The close binary nature of this star was discovered by Dutch American astronomer Dirk Reuyl in 1941, based upon an elongation of the star found in photographs. The two stars in the Wolf 424 system orbit about each other with a semi-major axis of 4.1 AU and an eccentricity of 0.3. The stars have an orbital period of 15.5 years and have a combined apparent magnitude of about 12.5.

Wolf 424A is a cool main sequence red dwarf star of approximately 0.14 solar masses (147 Jupiters) and a radius of 0.17 solar radii. Its companion, Wolf 424B, is a cool main sequence red dwarf star of approximately 0.13 solar masses (136 Jupiters) and a radius of 0.14 solar radii. They are two of the dimmest known objects within 15 light years of the Sun. In 1967, it was discovered that both are flare stars that undergo random increases in luminosity. The system has been designated FL Virginis, and may experience sunspot activity. The stars may undergo variation in the level of flare activity over periods lasting several years.

See also
 List of nearest stars

References

 W. D. Heintz, "Astrometric study of 4 binary stars", 1972, Astronomical Journal, 77, 160.

External links
 Wolf 424 Data page
 Wolf 424 AB
 A NASA image of Wolf 424 AB
 

Binary stars
Local Bubble
M-type main-sequence stars
Flare stars
Virgo (constellation)
0424
0473
Virginis, FL